Nicolas Benois may refer to:

Nicholas Benois (1813–1898), Russian architect
Nicola Alexandrovich Benois (1901–1988), Russian-born Italian scenographer and costume designer